Dennis Dirk Blocker (born July 31, 1957) is an American actor. He earned his first regular TV role on Baa Baa Black Sheep (1976–1978), playing pilot Jerry Bragg. From 2013–2021, he starred as Detective Michael Hitchcock on the Fox/NBC comedy series Brooklyn Nine-Nine. He is the son of actor Dan Blocker and Dolphia Lee Blocker (née Parker). His brother is producer David Blocker.

Career
Blocker began appearing on American television in 1974, acting in an episode of Marcus Welby, M.D. at the age of 16. He has had guest roles in ER; Little House on the Prairie; The X-Files; Beverly Hills, 90210; Walker, Texas Ranger; Night Court; Murder, She Wrote; M*A*S*H; Doogie Howser, M.D.; Matlock; Quantum Leap and CHiPs. At age 19, he was cast in the role of 1st Lt. Jerry Bragg on the military drama Baa Baa Black Sheep (1976–1978). He did not have another regular TV series role until being cast in Brooklyn Nine-Nine (2013–2021). 

He played a one-shot supporting role in Bonanza: The Return as a reporter named Fenster, though not as the son of Hoss Cartwright, the role made iconic by his father.

An article published by NBC states that (at an unspecificed date) "Blocker went back to school to earn his bachelor of arts degree so he could teach K-12" and in 2017, published a book that he had written, Master and the Little Monk, about "a lonely young boy who is befriended by a unique ally and mentor".
 
His film credits include Midnight Madness (1980), Raise the Titanic (1980), The Border (1982), Poltergeist (1982), Starman (1984), Trouble in Mind (1985), Made in Heaven (1987), Prince of Darkness (1987), Pink Cadillac (1989), Cutting Class (1989), Equinox (1992), Short Cuts (1993), Night of the Scarecrow (1995), and Mad City (1997).

Filmography

Marcus Welby, M.D. (1974, TV series) as Benji
Little House on the Prairie (1974, TV series) as Abel Makay (Episode "School Mom")
Lucas Tanner (1974, TV series) as Jordan Adair
The Family Holvak (1975, TV series) as Pete
Phyllis (1976, TV series) as Jack
Baa Baa Black Sheep (1976–78, TV series) as 1st Lt. Jerome "Jerry" Bragg
CHiPs (1978, TV series) as Turk
B.J. and the Bear (1979, TV series) as Jimmy Lee
Midnight Madness (1980) – Blaylak – Green Team
Raise the Titanic (1980) – Merker
M*A*S*H (1981, TV series) as James Mathes
The Border (1982) – Beef
Poltergeist (1982) – Jeff Shaw
Two of a Kind (1982, TV Movie) – Barry
Starman (1984) – Cop #1
Trouble in Mind (1985) – Rambo
Hunter (episode: The Jade Woman) (1987, TV series) as Randall FaneMade in Heaven (1987) – ShortyPrince of Darkness (1987) – MullinsMacGyver (1988)Born to Race (1988) – BudCutting Class (1989) – Coach HarrisPink Cadillac (1989) – Policeman #1Love at Large (1990) – Hiram Culver, Used-Car SalesmanEquinox (1992) – RedShort Cuts (1993) – Diner CustomerRiver of Rage (1993, TV Movie) – Sheriff MapesBonanza: The Return (1993, TV Movie) – Walter FensterBonanza: Under Attack (1995, TV Movie) – FensterNight of the Scarecrow (1995) – GeorgeThe Siege at Ruby Ridge (1996, TV Movie) – Undercover agent (uncredited)Larger Than Life (1996) – Airport Security ManBeverly Hills, 90210 (1997, TV Series) - Dan the Bartender (Episodes "Friends, Lovers, and Children" & "Deadline")Gun (1997, TV Series) – Clifford SuttonMad City (1997) – Bowler #2Inherit the Wind (1999, TV Movie) – Sheriff Sam GibsonDeadwood (2004, TV Series) – Jay JohnsonCriminal Minds (2009, TV Series) – TrentBrooklyn Nine-Nine'' (2013–2021, TV Series) – Detective Hitchcock

X-Files - Season 6 Episode 8 The Rain King

References

External links

1957 births
Living people
American male television actors
American male film actors
Male actors from Hollywood, Los Angeles
20th-century American male actors
21st-century American male actors